is a city in Sorachi Subprefecture, Hokkaido, Japan. It is the capital of Sorachi Subprefecture.

As of September 30, 2016, the city has an estimated population of 84,127 and the density of 170 persons per km².

On March 27, 2006, the town of Kurisawa, and the village of Kita (both from Sorachi District, Sorachi Subprefecture) merged into Iwamizawa.

History
The name of "Iwamizawa" is derived from Japanese word . and  means "Bathing" and "A swamp".

Iwamizawa was developed as a hub of land transportation around Iwamizawa Station.

1906 - Iwamizawa village became Iwamizawa town.
1943 - Iwamizawa town became Iwamizawa city.
2006 - Kurisawa town and Kita village were merged into Iwamizawa city.

Climate
Iwamizawa has a humid continental climate (Köppen climate classification Dfb) with warm summers and cold winters. Precipitation is significant throughout the year, but is heaviest from August to October.

Transportation

Rail
In the past, Horonai Line and Manji Line ran from Iwamizawa.
 Hakodate Main Line : Horomui - Kami-Horomui - Iwamizawa
 Muroran Main Line : Kurioka - Kurisawa - Shibun - Iwamizawa

Road
 Hokkaidō Expressway : Iwamizawa IC
 Route 12

Education

Universities
 Hokkaido University of Education, Iwamizawa Campus

High schools
 Hokkaido Iwamizawa Higashi High School
 Hokkaido Iwamizawa Nishi High School
 Hokkaido Iwamizawa Agricultural High School
 Hokkaido Iwamizawa Ryokuryo High School

Culture

Mascot

He is a playful onion who likes food. He is unveiled on 3 October 2010. He is assisted by  who is a female squirrel from Kita.

Religion
Iwamizawa Jinja, a Shinto shrine

Sister cities
  Pocatello, Idaho - The city was founded on April 1, 1943. Youth delegates are often sent from one to the other.
  Canby, Oregon

References

External links

 Official Website 
 Sightseeing information website  

 
Cities in Hokkaido